Simon Balkema (8 November 1896 – 20 October 1971) was a Dutch wrestler. He competed in the men's Greco-Roman middleweight at the 1928 Summer Olympics.

References

External links
 

1896 births
1971 deaths
Dutch male sport wrestlers
Olympic wrestlers of the Netherlands
Wrestlers at the 1928 Summer Olympics
Sportspeople from Amsterdam